The Frank E. Campbell Funeral Chapel is a funeral home located on Madison Avenue at 81st Street in Manhattan. Founded in 1898 as Frank E. Campbell Burial and Cremation Company, the company is now owned by Service Corporation International. The funeral home is known for staging many celebrity funerals including that of Jacqueline Kennedy Onassis, Rudolph Valentino, Judy Garland, Joan Crawford,  Heath Ledger,  The Notorious B.I.G. and Tommy Dorsey.

Frank Campbell, the founder of the business, was born on July 4, 1872, in Camp Point, Illinois.  He moved to New York in about 1892, and married Amelia Klutz in 1898, setting himself up as an undertaker near Twenty-Third Street and Eighth Avenue in Manhattan.  His innovations in the business included the use of a funeral chapel, which he felt was preferable to having the services in the home of the deceased; advertising, which had previously been rare among undertakers, and the use of cars instead of horse-drawn carriages as hearses.  He died on January 19, 1934, of heart disease.

Notable funerals 

 Aaliyah
 Amsale Aberra
 Elizabeth Arden
 Roscoe "Fatty" Arbuckle

 Pedro Armendáriz, Jr.
 Arthur Ashe
 Isaac Asimov
 Arleen Auger
 Antônio Carlos Jobim
 Herman Badillo
 Lauren Bacall
 George Ballanchine
 Bernard Baruch
 Jean-Michel Basquiat
 Irving Berlin
 Peter Boyle
 Clare A. Briggs
 Yul Brynner
 Lord Buckley
 James Cagney
 Milt Caniff
 Emilio Carranza
 Harry Carman 
 Lynne Carter
 Oleg Cassini
 Bennett Cerf
 Huguette Clark
 Montgomery Clift
 George M. Cohan
 Frank Costello
 Joan Crawford
 Walter Cronkite
 Celia Cruz
 Mario Cuomo
 Candy Darling
 Jack Dempsey
 Thomas E. Dewey
 Dominick Dunne
 Jeanne Eagels
 Perry Ellis
 Geraldine Ferraro
 Marshall Field III
 Malcolm Forbes
 Greta Garbo
 Judy Garland
 George Gershwin
 Ira Gershwin
 Lillian Gish
 Adam Goldstein
 Albert H. Gordon
 Lesley Gore
 Rocky Graziano
 Rex Harrison
 Rita Hayworth
 William Randolph Hearst, Jr.
 Heavy D
 Leona Helmsley
 Jim Henson
 Philip Seymour Hoffman
 Vladimir Horowitz
 Fannie Hurst
 Richard Isay
 Jacob Javits
 Peter Jennings
 Howard Deering Johnson
 Madeline Kahn
 George S. Kaufman
 Kenneth Keating
 Jacqueline Kennedy Onassis
 Robert F. Kennedy
 Dorothy Kilgallen
 Robert Kibbee 
 Allyn King
 Georgette Klinger
 Ed Koch
 Florence La Badie
 Andrew A. Lanyi
 Héctor Lavoe
 Mordecai Lawner
 Heath Ledger
 John Lennon
 Henry Cabot Lodge
 Dick Lynch
 Mary MacLeod Trump
 Norman Mailer
 Billy Martin
 Bat Masterson
 Ethel Merman
 Anna Moffo
 Mary Tyler Moore
 The Notorious B.I.G.
 Glenn O'Brien
 Cardinal John O'Connor
 Les Paul
 James Cash Penney
 Peter George Peterson
 Ayn Rand
 Tony Randall
 Charles Revson
 John Ringling
 Joan Rivers
 L'Wren Scott
 Bishop Fulton J. Sheen
 Willi Smith
 Jean Stapleton
 Igor Stravinsky
 Ed Sullivan
 Robert A. Taft 
 Cecil Taylor
 Nikola Tesla
 John Timoney
 Ernst Toller
 Arturo Toscanini
 Fred Trump
 Ivana Trump
 Rudolph Valentino
 Luther Vandross
 Robert F. Wagner
 Jimmy Walker
 Mae West
 Tennessee Williams
 Frank Woolworth
 Li Yong

References

External links

 
 Lopez, Molly, "Frank E. Campbell's Service to the Stars" , People, January 25, 2008

Companies based in New York City
American companies established in 1898
Death care companies of the United States
1898 establishments in New York City